The Prague Half Marathon (known as the Sportisimo Prague Half Marathon for sponsorship reasons) is an annual half marathon road running event which takes place in Spring on the city streets of Prague, Czech Republic, first held in 1999.  It is managed by the same organisation that holds the Prague Marathon in May.  The race has a loop course, starting and ending in Jan Palach Square near the Rudolfinum, and largely follows the Vltava river.  The competition has enjoyed an increasing level of participation, with around 6500 participants in 2009 and almost 8500 runners taking part in the 2010 event.

The Prague Half Marathon holds World Athletics Gold Label Road Race status.  Joyciline Jepkosgei set the half marathon world record at the time during this race with a time of 1:04:52 in 2017.

History 

The half marathon was first held in 1999.

In 2006, a corporate team half marathon relay event was added to the day's programme of events – each company being represented by four runners each covering equal legs of 5.27 km. Around 100 teams and 50 business and institutions were present for the first race.

Atsedu Tsegay holds the men's course record of 58:47 minutes (set in 2012), while Joyciline Jepkosgei's mark of 64:52 minutes (set in 2017) is the best achieved by a woman in the Prague race and a world record at the time.  Both of these times are the fastest ever run in the Czech Republic for the half marathon.

The 2020 edition of the race was cancelled due to the coronavirus pandemic, with all registrants given the option of transferring their entry to 2021 or 2022.

Prague 21.1 km 

Named "Prague 21.1 km", the race would consist of about 16.5 laps of an oval of length  on flat terrain in the park, with the men and women competing separately.

On the day of the race, Kenyan Peres Jepchirchir broke the women-only half marathon world record with a time of 1:05:34.  The world record held for only 42 days, as Jepchirchir broke it again herself at the 2020 World Athletics Half Marathon Championships in Gdynia, Poland, with a time of 1:05:16.

Course 

The Prague Half Marathon has a looped course format which has its race start and end point on Jan Palach Square near the Rudolfinum. The course follows the Vltava river southwards and then makes an east-to-west loop passing Folimanka park. It crosses to the west side of the Vltava, heading over Palacky Bridge, and after heading south along Strakonická road it doubles back to follow the river north, before crossing Legií Bridge to reach the halfway point. The course traces a large loop into the northern part of the city centre before returning to the Rudolfinum for the finish point.

Winners

Prague Half Marathon 

Kenyan athletes have been dominant – all but four of the men's winners come from the East African country, which has also provided over half the female race winners. Daniel Wanjiru has topped the men's podium on two occasions, and both Jana Klimešová and Rose Kosgei have taken back-to-back wins in the women's event.

Key: Course record (in bold)

Prague 21.1 km

By country

Notes

References

External links

Official website

Half marathons
Sport in Prague
Athletics competitions in the Czech Republic
Recurring sporting events established in 1999
1999 establishments in the Czech Republic
Annual events in the Czech Republic
Spring (season) events in the Czech Republic